André Belin (1896-1983) was a French spelunker, active in North Africa.

Spelunking activities
With the help of some friends, André formed a group related to the Speleological Society of France.

In Algeria, André explored the Anou Boussouil, which would later become the second largest pit in the world in 1950.

References

Further reading
 Delanghe Damien, Medals and Awards (PDF document), in: Cahiers du CDS No. 12, May 2001.
 Association of former officials of the French Federation of Speleology : In Memoriam.
 Boulanger, P. (1966), page 104
 Chabert, J. and Choppy, J. (1983), André Belin, in 'Spelunca' (Paris) 1983 (12)

1896 births
1983 deaths